Pablo Felipe Pereira de Jesus (born 2 January 2004), known simply as Pablo, is a Portuguese professional footballer who plays as a forward for F.C. Famalicão.

Club career
Born in Braga to former FC Porto and S.C. Braga Brazilian player Pena, Pablo joined F.C. Famalicão's youth system at the age of 15 following a brief spell in his father's homeland with Fluminense FC. In July 2021, after having made his senior debut with the club's under-23 team, he signed a professional contract until 2024.

Pablo made his Primeira Liga debut with the main squad debut on 8 August 2021, coming on as a 60th-minute substitute in a 2–0 away loss against F.C. Paços de Ferreira. On 15 September 2022, he further extended his link until 2027.

References

External links

2004 births
Living people
Portuguese people of Brazilian descent
Sportspeople from Braga
Portuguese footballers
Association football forwards
Primeira Liga players
F.C. Famalicão players